Mercy Maston (born November 10, 1992) is a professional Canadian football defensive back for the Winnipeg Blue Bombers of the Canadian Football League (CFL).

Playing career
Maston started his CFL career with the Edmonton Eskimos but was limited in playing time due to an Achilles injury. Following two years with the Eskimos, Mercy was released in January 2019 and signed a futures contract with the Philadelphia Eagles, but was cut before playing an NFL game. Following injuries to Brandon Alexander and Marcus Rios, the Blue Bombers needed help in the secondary and signed Maston in August 2019. Maston helped the Blue Bombers win the 107th Grey Cup, defeating the Hamilton Tiger-Cats 33–12. Following the win, he signed an extension with Winnipeg through to the end of the 2020 season. After the CFL canceled the 2020 season due to the COVID-19 pandemic, he chose to opt-out of his contract with the Blue Bombers on August 31, 2020. He signed a one-year contract with the Blue Bombers on January 7, 2021. Maston suffered a season ending torn Achilles tendon in training camp and did not play with the team through the 2021 CFL season. Following the season he signed an extension with the Bombers for the 2022 season.

Statistics

CFL

References

External links
Winnipeg Blue Bombers bio

1992 births
Living people
African-American players of Canadian football
American football cornerbacks
Players of American football from Bakersfield, California
Winnipeg Blue Bombers players
Canadian football defensive backs
Bakersfield Renegades football players
Boise State Broncos football players
Edmonton Elks players
21st-century African-American sportspeople